Sir Abraham Elton, 2nd Baronet (baptised 30 June 1679 – 20 October 1742) of Bristol and Clevedon Court, Somerset, was a British merchant, slave trader and Whig politician, who sat in the House of Commons for Taunton between 1724 and 1727, and then for Bristol from 1727 until his death in 1742. He also served as the High Sheriff of Bristol from 1710 to 1711, and was Mayor of Bristol for the year 1719 to 1720.

Early life and family
Elton was the eldest son of Abraham Elton (later created the first of the Elton baronets), and his wife Mary Jefferies. His date of birth is not known, but he was baptised on 30 June 1679. He married Abigail Bayly, the daughter of Zachary Bayly of Charlcot House, near Westbury, Wiltshire and Northwood Park, near Glastonbury, Somerset, on 14 May 1702.

Business career
Elton was a merchant and industrialist, and like his father before him, he served as the High Sheriff of Bristol in 1710–11. He invested in slave ships with his brothers, Isaac and Jacob. He was the Master of the Society of Merchant Venturers in 1719 and Mayor of Bristol from 1719–20, but in 1720 he was made bankrupt during the "South Sea Bubble". As soon as he completed his term as Mayor, he left Bristol and travelled to France, and did not return until his father paid off his debts.

Member of Parliament
 Elton returned to England by 1724, and stood in the Taunton by-election of 1724 for the Whigs, as an unexpected late entrant. He was duly elected to serve as a Member of Parliament for Taunton, though one of the other candidates, George Deane, filed a petition against his election. The petition was rejected by a vote of 151 to 104. He only served Taunton until the general election in 1727, when his father vacated his seat in Bristol. At the resulting election, Elton paid his Tory opponent £1,000 to withdraw from the election, allowing him to be returned unopposed. In Parliament, he became a member of the gaols committee. In February 1730 he spoke against the Royal African Company’s petition to be spared the cost of maintaining their forts. He often petitioned government on mercantile issues, amongst them: in 1730 for the removal of duty on soaps and candles, five separate times for the removal of duty on Irish yarn, and twice against the introduction of slave duties. He was said to have made a "bantering speech" against the proposed Excise Bill of 1733.

Elton topped the poll in a contest at the 1734 general election. He continued raising petitions on mercantile issues, and voted with the Opposition in all recorded divisions. He was returned unopposed at the 1741 general election.

Personal life
Upon his father's death on 9  February 1728, Elton became Sir Abraham Elton, 2nd Baronet, and inherited Clevedon Court.

Elton died on 20 October 1742, leaving three sons and three daughters. The baronetage passed to his eldest son, who became Sir Abraham Elton, 3rd Baronet but died without issue. The baronetcy then passed to his brother Sir (Abraham) Isaac Elton, 4th Baronet. Another of Elton's sons, Jacob, became a Royal Navy captain but was killed in a sea battle. Elton's daughters Mary and Elizabeth both married.

References

1679 births
1742 deaths
British MPs 1722–1727
British MPs 1727–1734
British MPs 1734–1741
British MPs 1741–1747
Members of the Parliament of Great Britain for English constituencies
Whig (British political party) MPs for English constituencies
Baronets in the Baronetage of Great Britain
High Sheriffs of Bristol
Mayors of Bristol
English slave traders
Members of the Society of Merchant Venturers